Micrometopus punctipennis is a species of beetle in the family Cerambycidae, and the only species in the genus Micrometopus. It was described by Quedenfeldt in 1885.

References

Dorcasominae
Beetles described in 1885
Monotypic beetle genera